The Sant'Anna funicular is a funicular railway in the Italian city of Genoa connecting the Piazza Portello, on the edge of the historic city centre, to the Corso Magenta. The line is one of several true funiculars in the city, including the Zecca–Righi funicular and the Quezzi funicular, although the Principe–Granarolo rack railway is also sometimes erroneously described as a funicular.

History 
The funicular was opened in 1891, and was initially water-driven, with water filling a ballast tank under the carriage at the top station, and emptying at the bottom. The line was converted to electric operation in 1980, and was again modernized in 1991 following a fire that destroyed the top station.

From 1 December 2021 it has been free to use courtesy of the Municipality of Genoa and AMT.

Operation 
The line is currently managed by AMT Genova, and has the following parameters:

See also 
 List of funicular railways

References

External links 
 
Brochure on all lifts, funicular & rack railways in Genoa

Former water-powered funicular railways converted to electricity
Funicular railways in Italy
Railway lines in Liguria
Transport in Genoa